Linotype may refer to:

 Linotype machine, a typesetting machine, once commonly used for newspapers
 Mergenthaler Linotype Company (later, Linotype GmbH), a type foundry that produced the first linotype machines
 Linotype (alloy), a group of lead alloys, used in linotype machines